Omar Ortega is an Argentine Olympic middle-distance runner. He represented his country in the men's 1500 meters at the 1984 Summer Olympics. His time was a DNF in the first heat.

References 

1960 births
Living people
Argentine male middle-distance runners
Pan American Games competitors for Argentina
Olympic athletes of Argentina
Athletes (track and field) at the 1983 Pan American Games
Athletes (track and field) at the 1984 Summer Olympics
South American Games bronze medalists for Argentina
South American Games medalists in athletics
Competitors at the 1982 Southern Cross Games
Athletes from Buenos Aires
20th-century Argentine people